Denial is a 2016 biographical film directed by Mick Jackson and written by David Hare, based on Deborah Lipstadt's 2005 book History on Trial: My Day in Court with a Holocaust Denier. It dramatises the Irving v Penguin Books Ltd case, in which Lipstadt, a Holocaust scholar, was sued by Holocaust denier David Irving for libel. It stars Rachel Weisz, Tom Wilkinson, Timothy Spall, Andrew Scott, Jack Lowden, Caren Pistorius and Alex Jennings.

Denial premiered at the Toronto International Film Festival on 11 September 2016. It was theatrically released in the United States by Bleecker Street on 30 September 2016, and in the United Kingdom by StudioCanal and Entertainment One on 27 January 2017.

Plot
Deborah Lipstadt is an American professor of Holocaust studies whose speaking engagement is disrupted by David Irving, a writer on Nazi Germany. He files a libel lawsuit in the United Kingdom against Lipstadt and her publisher for declaring him a Holocaust denier in her books. As the burden of proof in UK libel cases lies with the defendant, Lipstadt and her legal team, led by solicitor Anthony Julius and barrister Richard Rampton, must prove that Irving lied about the Holocaust.

To prepare their defence, Lipstadt and Rampton tour the site of the former Auschwitz concentration camp in Poland along with Professor Robert van Pelt who explains about the operation of the gas chambers, while the research team subpoenas Irving's extensive personal diaries. Lipstadt is annoyed by Rampton's apparently disrespectful questions on the subject, and frustrated when the team minimized her involvement in the case, arguing that she harms its chances of success. Members of the British Jewish community plead with her to settle out of court to avoid creating publicity for Irving. However, her team has a promising start when they persuade Irving, by appealing to his ego, to agree to a trial by judge instead of a jury, which he could have manipulated to his advantage.

Irving conducts his own legal representation, facing Lipstadt's legal team. Irving endeavours to twist the presented evidence for the defence. Lipstadt is approached by a Holocaust survivor who pleads for the chance to testify, but Lipstadt's legal team insisted on focusing the trial on Irving.

Irving tries to discredit Professor van Pelt's evidence for the existence of gas chambers at Auschwitz, claiming there were no holes on the roof for the Zyklon B gas crystals to be introduced. His soundbite "no holes, no Holocaust" dominated the media coverage. Furious, Lipstadt demands that she and the Holocaust survivors be allowed to take the stand. Julius angrily counters that Irving would only humiliate and exploit a survivor on cross-examination, as he has in the past. Rampton visits Lipstadt at her home to explain his approach and earns her trust. In court, he subjects Irving to skillful cross-examination and exposes his claims as absurd, while expert testimony from respected scholars like Richard J. Evans expose the distortions in Irving's writings.

As the trial concludes, the judge, Charles Gray, worries the defence by suggesting that, if Irving honestly believes his own claims, then he cannot be lying as Lipstadt asserted. Gray eventually rules for the defence, however, convinced of the truth of Lipstadt's portrayal of Irving as deceitful. Lipstadt is hailed for her dignified demeanour, while her legal team reminds her that, despite her silence during the trial, it was her writing that countered Irving's lies and provided the basis for the victory. At a press conference, Lipstadt praises her lawyers for their strategy.

Cast

 Rachel Weisz as Deborah Lipstadt
 Tom Wilkinson as Richard Rampton
 Timothy Spall as David Irving
 Andrew Scott as Anthony Julius
 Jack Lowden as James Libson
 Caren Pistorius as Laura Tyler
 Alex Jennings as Sir Charles Gray
 Mark Gatiss as Robert Jan van Pelt
 Andrea Deck as Leonie
 Sally Messham as Meg
 Sean Power as Mitch
 John Sessions as Professor Richard Evans
 Nikki Amuka-Bird as Lilly Holbrook
 Harriet Walter as Vera Reich

Production
In April 2015, Hilary Swank and Tom Wilkinson were selected to star in the film, based on the book History on Trial: My Day in Court with a Holocaust Denier by Deborah Lipstadt, with Mick Jackson directing, and Gary Foster and Russ Krasnoff producing under their Krasnoff/Foster Entertainment banner with Shoebox Films. Participant Media and BBC Films co-financed. In November 2015, Rachel Weisz replaced Swank, and Timothy Spall joined the cast, with Bleecker Street distributing the film. In December 2015, Andrew Scott, Jack Lowden, Caren Pistorius, Alex Jennings, and Harriet Walter joined the cast. Howard Shore composed the film's score.

Principal photography began in December 2015 and concluded by the end of January 2016. Denial was filmed in London and at the Auschwitz-Birkenau State Museum, Poland.

Release
The film had its world premiere at the Toronto International Film Festival on 11 September 2016. The film was released in the United States in a limited release on 30 September 2016, and in the United Kingdom on 27 January 2017.

Reception

Critical reception
Denial received positive reviews from critics. On the review aggregator website Rotten Tomatoes, the film has an approval rating of 83%, based on 167 reviews, with an average grade of 6.80/10. The website's critical consensus reads, "If Denial doesn't quite do its incredible story complete justice, it comes close enough to offer a satisfying, impactful drama – and another powerful performance from Rachel Weisz." On Metacritic, the film has a score of 63 out of 100, based on 34 critics, indicating "generally favorable reviews".

Accolades

References

External links
 
 
 
 Official screenplay

2010s English-language films
2016 biographical drama films
2010s legal films
British biographical drama films
British legal films
American legal drama films
Bleecker Street films
BBC Film films
American courtroom films
David Irving
Films about Jews and Judaism
Films about Holocaust denial
Drama films based on actual events
Films based on non-fiction books
Films directed by Mick Jackson
Films set in the 1990s
Entertainment One films
2016 drama films
Films about antisemitism
Films scored by Howard Shore
Films set in Poland
Films set in Georgia (U.S. state)
Films shot in London
Films shot in Poland
2010s American films
2010s British films